Interloire (or TER 200 Interloire) is a French train service run by TER Centre-Val de Loire and TER Pays de la Loire linking Orléans to Le Croisic via Blois, Saint-Pierre-des-Corps, Saumur, Angers and Nantes.

The sections between Nantes-Angers and Tours-Orléans are respectively part of the major railway axes Paris-Nantes and Paris-Bordeaux (on the classic lines). The electrification, the bigger curve radii and the absence of level crossings make this one of the rare lines with an authorised speed of 200 km/h.

During weekdays, there are on average 3 return journeys per day Orléans-Nantes, of which one is extended to Le Croisic. On weekends, the service is more frequent.

Route 
Stations in bold are served by every train as they pass through the respective station.

References 

Transport in Centre-Val de Loire
Transport in Pays de la Loire
Transport express régional